Kadhalikka Neramillai ( No time to love) is a 2007–08 Indian Tamil-language soap opera starring Chandra Lakshman, Prajin and Srinath. It aired from 26 November 2007 to 21 August 2008 on STAR Vijay 

This serial re-telecast on STAR Vijay Super from January 6, 2017.

Synopsis
The story revolves around two professionals Shakthi and Divya, their life and their love.

Cast
 Chandra Lakshman as Divya
 Prajin as Sakthi (Sakthivel)
 Srinath as Sri
 Attakathi Dinesh as Santhanam
 Aadukalam Naren as Chandru (Divya's father)
 O. A. K. Sundar as Murugavel (Sakthi's father)

Soundtrack
The title track of the series was composed by Vijay Antony with lyrics by Thenmozhi Das and sung by Sangeetha Rajeshwaran. The song was well reached among audience.

References

External links
 Official website

Star Vijay original programming
Tamil-language romance television series
2007 Tamil-language television series debuts
2017 Tamil-language television series debuts
2008 Tamil-language television series endings
Tamil-language television shows